The 1985 Notre Dame Fighting Irish football team represented the University of Notre Dame in the 1985 NCAA Division I-A football season. The team was coached by Gerry Faust and played its home games at Notre Dame Stadium in South Bend, Indiana.

Schedule

Roster

Game summaries

at Michigan

Michigan State

at Purdue

at Air Force

Army

USC

Source:

Navy

Ole Miss

at Penn State

LSU

at Miami (FL)

Awards and honors
Allen Pinkett finished 8th in voting for the Heisman Trophy.
Former Fighting Irish players Paul Hornung and Jim Martin were inducted into the College Football Hall of Fame

Team players drafted into the NFL

References

Notre Dame
Notre Dame Fighting Irish football seasons
Notre Dame Fighting Irish football